Sri Hargobindpur is a town and a municipal council in Gurdaspur district in the Indian state of Punjab. Situated on the banks of the Beas River
Sixth Guru of Sikhs Shri Guru Hargobind Sahib ji established this city on the land bought by his Father and fifth Guru, Shri Guru Arjan Dev Sahib ji, the city is also the erstwhile capital of the Ramgarhia Misl.

The Gurudwara Dhamdama Sahib stands at the site of the battle of Hargobindpur fought between Sikh forces led by Guru Hargobind and Mughal forces in 1630.

Demographics
 India census, Sri Har Gobind Pur had a population of 3,993. Males constitute 52% of the population and females 48%. There is an average literacy rate of 66%, higher than the national average of 59.5%: male literacy is 69%, and female literacy is 63%. 12% of the population is under 6 years of age.

The oldest standing monument in the town is Guru Ki Maseet, made by Guru Hargobind, on request of local Muslims.

Politics 
The city is part of the Sri Hargobindpur Assembly Constituency.

References

Cities and towns in Gurdaspur district